Philip Sawyer (born 29 December 1951) is a former Australian cyclist. He competed in the team pursuit event at the 1972 Summer Olympics.

References

External links
 

1951 births
Living people
Australian male cyclists
Olympic cyclists of Australia
Cyclists at the 1972 Summer Olympics
Australian track cyclists
Place of birth missing (living people)